Scawthorpe is a suburb of Doncaster in South Yorkshire, England on the A638 road. It is split between the city council wards of Roman Ridge and Bentley.

History
Historically in the West Riding of Yorkshire, it was in the civil parish of Bentley with Arksey. Scawthorpe expanded in the early 20th century following the opening of Bentley Colliery, when affordable houses were built by the National Coal Board. Development has slowed since the 1970s, however recent residential developments include The Sycamores, Kingdom Close and Mayfields in the north-west, and Scotsman Drive in the south.

References

Villages in Doncaster